Bereina is a town in the Central Province of Papua New Guinea. Bereina also hosts a regional airport and a district town for the people of Kairuku Rural Area.

Education
Bereina is home to three elementary schools and one primary school. A short distance to the south is Mainohana Catholic High School, a De La Salle Year 9–12 school established in 1958.

Climate
Bereina has a tropical savanna climate (Köppen Aw) with heavy rainfall from December to April and moderate to little rainfall in the remaining months.

References

Populated places in Central Province (Papua New Guinea)